Shri (named after Palden Lhamo, a Buddhist deity) is a genus of dromaeosaurid theropod dinosaur discovered in the Barun Goyot Formation in Khulsan, Mongolia. The fossil remains of Shri date back to the Late Cretaceous period. The type and only species, Shri devi, was described in 2021 by paleontologist Alan H. Turner and colleagues.

Description 

The holotype specimen of Shri is IGM 100/980. This specimen was discovered on 5 July 1991 by Mark Norell. It was nicknamed "Ichabodcraniosaurus" by Norell, as mentioned by Novacek (1996), after Ichabod Crane, a fictional character haunted by a headless ghost, because it lacked the skull. In 1999 it was provisionally considered a specimen of Velociraptor mongoliensis. It consists of a partially articulated individual that preserves the right hindlimb, the left tibiotarsus, as well as the pelvis and a series of cervical, dorsal, sacral and caudal vertebrae.

This specimen is distinguishable from Velociraptor mongoliensis based on a weak fourth trochanter, this is however, also shared with all other dromaeosaurids, and deep anterior pedicular fossae in the cervical vertebrae. Another distinguishing trait of Shri is that its epipophyses in the last four cervicals are not raised but instead are represented by rugose circular scars.

Classification 
Shri devi was entered into a phylogenetic analysis to test its relationships within Dromaeosauridae. It was found to be the sister taxon of Velociraptor mongoliensis based on the presence of a distinct ambiens tubercle that is located proximally on the anterior face of the pubis, a well-developed anterior tuberosity located high on the ischium, as well as a rounded ischial ridge that runs lengthwise. A cladogram of the phylogenetic analysis performed by the describers is shown below:

References 

Eudromaeosaurs
Campanian genera
Late Cretaceous dinosaurs of Asia
Cretaceous Mongolia
Paleontology in Mongolia
Barun Goyot Formation
Fossil taxa described in 2021